The 2002 Brickyard 400, the 9th running of the event, was a NASCAR Winston Cup Series race held on August 4, 2002 at Indianapolis Motor Speedway in Speedway, Indiana. Contested at 160 laps on the 2.5 mile (4.023 km) speedway, it was the twenty-first race of the 2002 NASCAR Winston Cup Series season. Bill Elliott of Evernham Motorsports won the race.

This was the first race to feature Steel and Foam Reduction (SAFER) barrier at Indianapolis that will used to make racing accidents safer.

Background

The Indianapolis Motor Speedway, located in Speedway, Indiana, (an enclave suburb of Indianapolis) in the United States, is the home of the Indianapolis 500 and the Brickyard 400. The track's turns are banked at 9 degrees, while the front stretch, the location of the finish line, has no banking. The back stretch, opposite of the front, also has a zero degree banking. The racetrack has seats for more than 250,000 spectators.

Summary
Kurt Busch and Jimmy Spencer, locked in a burgeoning feud dating back to Bristol, collided on lap 36. Busch hit the turn 3 wall. Veteran Bill Elliott added the Brickyard to his long resume, and Rusty Wallace finished second for the third time

Following the race, Tony Stewart was fined $50,000 and placed into probation not by NASCAR, but by his sponsor, The Home Depot, for punching a photographer post-race.

Race results

Failed to qualify: Ron Hornaday Jr. (#49), Derrike Cope (#37), Scott Wimmer (#27), Tony Raines (#74), Jim Sauter (#71), Stuart Kirby (#57), P. J. Jones (#50)

Race statistics
 Time of race: 3:11:57
 Average Speed: 
 Pole Speed: 182.96
 Cautions: 8 for 36 laps
 Margin of Victory: 1.269 sec
 Lead changes: 16
 Percent of race run under caution: 22.5%         
 Average green flag run: 13.8 laps

References

Brickyard 400
Brickyard 400
NASCAR races at Indianapolis Motor Speedway